Polish  may refer to:
 Anything from or related to Poland, a country in Europe
 Polish language
 Polish people, people from Poland or of Polish descent
 Polish chicken
Polish brothers (Mark Polish and Michael Polish, born 1970), American twin screenwriters

Polish  may refer to:
 Polishing, the process of creating a smooth and shiny surface by rubbing or chemical action
 French polishing, polishing wood to a high gloss finish
 Nail polish
 Shoe polish
 Polish (screenwriting), improving a script in smaller ways than in a rewrite

See also
 
 
 Polonaise (disambiguation)

Language and nationality disambiguation pages